The International Alliance for Responsible Drinking (IARD), headquartered in Washington D.C., is a not-for-profit organization dedicated to reducing harmful drinking and promoting understanding of responsible drinking. It is supported by the world’s leading beer, wine, and spirits producers. IARD members include Anheuser-Busch InBev, Asahi Group Holdings, Ltd., Bacardi Limited, Beam Suntory, Brown-Forman Corporation, Carlsberg, Diageo, Heineken, Kirin Holdings Company, Limited, Molson Coors, Pernod Ricard, and William Grant & Sons.

History 
IARD was launched in January 2015 and builds on two decades of research, policy analysis and programs by the International Center for Alcohol Policies (ICAP), as well as the efforts of the Global Alcohol Producers Group (GAPG).

Raising Standards 
IARD works with stakeholders to help them raise standards in various areas in order to reduce harmful drinking.

 IARD has worked with the World Federation of Advertisers (WFA) to produce a series of videos to help all alcohol producers and their agencies to implement effective safeguards to prevent minors from seeing alcohol marketing online, and continues to work with digital platforms to give users the choice to block marketing from beer, wine, and spirits producers.
 On 25 January 2020, IARD Members announced an immediate roll out of "a clear age-restriction symbol or equivalent words on all of [their] alcohol brand products – including alcohol-free extensions of alcohol brands – ..., where legally permissible, with compliance across all markets by 2024."
 On 25 May 2021, IARD Members and 14 prominent global and regional online retailers and e-commerce and delivery platforms announced global standards for online alcohol sales and delivery that identify five key safeguards.

Producers' Commitments 
The 11 (at the time) CEO signatories and their companies are part of the Producers' Commitments to reduce harmful drinking. IARD was the secretariat to the Beer, Wine and Spirits Producers’ Commitments to Reduce Harmful Drinking. IARD’s formation was driven by the companies’ keenness to increase momentum around the Commitments and, in general, to step up action to meet the target on harmful drinking agreed by governments.

References

Non-profit organizations based in Washington, D.C.
International non-profit organizations
2014 establishments in Washington, D.C.
Alcohol industry trade associations